Alexandre Minkowski (5 December 1915 – 7 May 2004) was a French paediatrician, and arguably the French physician who most influenced neonatology in the 20th century. He was born and died in Paris.

He was the son of the eminent medical philosopher, Eugene Minkowski and the psychiatrist, Françoise Minkowska. They were Polish Jewish doctors who became naturalised French citizens after World War I and settled in France. They kept up their links with their ancestral Poland.

His son is the orchestral conductor Marc Minkowski.

External links
Perinatal Profiles: Alexandre Minkowski, founder of "Biology of the Neonate"
Alexandre Minkowski est mort - Article de J.-Y. Nau

1915 births
2004 deaths
Physicians from Paris
French people of Polish-Jewish descent
Ecology Generation politicians
French pediatricians